; ;) is a city in Los Angeles County, California. Located on Santa Monica Bay, it was incorporated on January 18, 1917, and is part of the South Bay Cities Council of Governments. The population was 16,731 as of the 2020 census, a 0.5% increase from 16,654 in the 2010 census.

History
The El Segundo and Los Angeles coastal area was first settled by the Tongva (or Gabrieleños) Native American tribes thousands of years ago. The area was once a part of Rancho Sausal Redondo ("Round Willow Patch Ranch"). Rancho Sausal Redondo extended from Playa Del Rey in the north to Redondo Beach in the south. Originally a Mexican land grant owned by Antonio Ygnacio Avila, the rancho was later purchased by a Scottish baronet named Sir Robert Burnett. After his return to Scotland, the property was purchased by then-manager of the rancho, Daniel Freeman. Daniel Freeman sold portions of the rancho to several persons. Peck also developed land in neighboring El Porto, where a street still bears his name. The city earned its name ("the second" in Spanish), as it was the site of the second Standard Oil refinery on the West Coast (the first was at Richmond in Northern California), when Standard Oil of California purchased the farm land in 1911.

The city was incorporated in 1917. The Standard Oil Company was renamed Chevron in 1984. The El Segundo refinery entered its second century of operation in 2011.

The Douglas Aircraft Company plant in El Segundo was one of the major aircraft manufacturing facilities in California during World War II. It was one of the major producers of SBD Dauntless dive bombers, which achieved fame in the Battle of Midway. The facility, now operated by Northrop Grumman, is still an aircraft plant.

Geography
The northern and southern boundaries of the town are Los Angeles International Airport and Manhattan Beach, with the Pacific Ocean as the western boundary. Its eastern boundary is roughly marked by Aviation Blvd.

Guinness World Records has listed El Segundo as having the most roads with a hill or grade.

Demographics

2010
The 2010 United States Census reported that El Segundo had a population of 16,654. The racial makeup of El Segundo was 12,997 (78.0%) White (69.1% non-Hispanic White), 337 (2.0%) African American, 68 (0.4%) Native American, 1,458 (8.8%) Asian, 38 (0.2%) Pacific Islander, 799 (4.8%) from other races, and 957 (5.7%) from two or more races. Hispanics or Latinos of any race were 2,609 persons (15.7%).

The Census reported that 16,578 people (99.5% of the population) lived in households, 66 (0.4%) lived in non-institutionalized group quarters, and 10 (0.1%) were institutionalized.

Of the 7,085 households, 2,183 (30.8%) had children under the age of 18 living in them, 3,050 (43.0%) were married couples living together, 729 (10.3%) had a female householder with no husband present, 326 (4.6%) had a male householder with no wife present; and 369 (5.2%) were unmarried opposite-sex partnerships. About 31.8% were made up of individuals, and 8.0% had someone living alone who was 65 years of age or older. The average household size was 2.34. The city had 4,105 families (57.9% of all households); the average family size was 3.02.

22.3% of the population was under the age of 18, 6.7% was 18 to 24, 31.1% was 25 to 44, 29.8% was 45 to 64, and 10.1%o was 65 or older. The median age was 39.2. For every 100 females, there were 99.4 males. For every 100 females 18 and over, there were 98.8 males.

The homeowner vacancy rate was 0.4%; the rental vacancy rate was 4.1%. About 49.1% of the population lived in owner-occupied housing units and 50.4% in rental housing units.

According to the 2010 United States Census, El Segundo had a median household income of $84,341, with 4.8% of the population living below the federal poverty line.

2000
As of the 2000 Census, the population density was 2,894.6 inhabitants per square mile (1,117.4/km2). The racial makeup of the city was 83.61% White, 1.17% African American, 0.47% Native American, 6.41% Asian, 0.29% Pacific Islander, 3.51% from other races, and 4.55% from two or more races. Hispanics or Latinos of any race were 11.01% of the population.

Of the 7,060 households, 28.1% had children under the age of 18 living with them, 41.5% were married couples living together, 10.0% had a female householder with no husband present, and 44.6% were not families. Of all households, 34.3% were made up of individuals, and 7.5% had someone living alone who was 65 years of age or older. The average household size was 2.27 and the average family size was 3.00.

22.7% of the population was under age 18, 6.2% from 18 to 24, 38.7% from 25 to 44, 22.9% from 45 to 64, and 9.5% 65 or older. The median age was 36. For every 100 females, there were 98.7 males. For every 100 females 18 and over, there were 96.0 males.

The median income for a household in the city was $61,341, and for a family was $74,007. Males had a median income of $52,486 versus $41,682 for females. The per capita income for the city was $33,996. About 3.1% of families and 4.6% of the population were below the poverty line, including 4.7% of those under age 18 and 6.0% of those age 65 or over.

Economy

The name was adopted in 1911 when Chevron built its second refinery, El Segundo, which is Spanish for "the Second". This refinery has received crude oil from the Amazon region of South America - more than 5,000 barrels per day.  El Segundo is located next to the Hyperion sewage treatment plant and the El Segundo power plant. The El Segundo power plant is operated by the American energy company NRG. NRG was to create a new combined cycle power island, providing power for 240,000 households. The new power plant, slated to go online in 2013, was to use two generators: a Siemens gas turbine and an additional steam turbine. Prior to its dissolution, Unocal was headquartered in El Segundo. 

In 1928 William Mines, an immigrant from Canada, leased land for a flying field. In 1930, Los Angeles Municipal Airport, later Los Angeles International Airport, opened north of El Segundo; its presence led to the concentration of aerospace and aviation-related firms in the El Segundo area. Many large aerospace companies have facilities in El Segundo, including Boeing, Raytheon, Lockheed Martin, Northrop Grumman, Wyle Laboratories, the Aerospace Corporation, and Aerojet Rocketdyne Holdings. The last two are headquartered there. It is also home to the Los Angeles Air Force Base and the Space and Missile Systems Center, which is responsible for space-related acquisition for the military.

The current Boeing factory, the Boeing Satellite Development Center, was originally built by Nash Motors in 1946 and opened in 1948. In 1955, Hughes Aircraft Company purchased the  building; it was converted to build missiles and also served as a test facility. At one time, MGM Grand Air had its headquarters in El Segundo. 

Toy manufacturer Mattel, AT&T Entertainment Hub (formerly DirecTV) direct technology marketing company PCM, Inc., and A-Mark Precious Metals are headquartered there, as well as sporting goods retailer Big 5 Sporting Goods and Stamps.com. Database company Teradata has a research and development facility in El Segundo, as well. The North American headquarters of the Japanese video game company Square Enix are also in the city.

From 1982 until 1996, the headquarters of the Los Angeles Raiders of the National Football League was located in El Segundo. The Los Angeles Kings Hockey Club is also located in El Segundo. In 2024, the Los Angeles Chargers will move their headquarters to El Segundo from Costa Mesa.

Film production companies are located in El Segundo, including Rhythm and Hues Studios and Lightstorm Entertainment.

The Los Angeles Times moved its newsroom from downtown Los Angeles to a  campus in El Segundo in 2018.

Top employers
According to the city's 2020–21 Comprehensive Annual Financial Report, the top employers in the city are:

Subsidiaries of companies
Nexon America, the North American branch of Korean online game publisher Nexon Co. Ltd. has its offices in El Segundo.

The North American branch of the Japanese video game publisher and developer Square Enix has its headquarters in El Segundo.

Due to its proximity to Los Angeles International Airport, El Segundo became the host of several offices of airlines. In 1979, the United Airlines Reservation Center, a two-story, $4.5 million,  facility in the International Center, was scheduled to begin construction. Austin Co., a firm in Irvine, was to build the facility, which was scheduled for opening in May of that year. Japan Airlines operates its United States headquarters, which was moved from New York City to El Segundo in around 2003. at Suite 620 of 300 Continental Boulevard; Cathay Pacific has an office in El Segundo. The airline moved its North America headquarters to Greater Los Angeles in 1990, and the headquarters were situated in El Segundo until 2005.

Air China operates its North American headquarters in the  2131 East Maple Avenue building, south of LAX, in El Segundo. Its current North American headquarters opened with a ribbon cutting ceremony and other festivities on Friday March 26, 2010. The call center reservations, marketing, and sales employees all moved into the building. The building includes a call center with space for 50 employees; when the building opened, half of the spaces had been filled.

Air New Zealand operates its United States headquarters in El Segundo. Other airlines with offices in El Segundo include Turkish Airlines, Thai Airways, Air Tahiti Nui, Aeroméxico, China Airlines Emirates, EVA Air, and Singapore Airlines.

Infineon Technologies acquired El Segundo-based company International Rectifier in 2015.

Parks and recreation

El Segundo has its own beach, as well as three public pools, two of which are outdoor pools open only during the summer months. The El Segundo Parks and Recreation staff are the basis for the hit NBC program Parks and Recreation. El Segundo has two full-sized turf fields named Campus El Segundo Athletic Fields, which are open to the public.

Government

Local government
According to the city's most recent Comprehensive Annual Financial Report, its various funds had $99.0 million in revenues, $91.0 million in expenditures, $206.5 million in total assets, $33.6 million in total liabilities, and $50.4 million in cash and investments.

In the Los Angeles County Board of Supervisors, El Segundo is in the Second District, represented by Holly Mitchell.

State and federal representation

Education

The El Segundo Unified School District serves the residential district of El Segundo, west of Pacific Coast Highway.  It operates El Segundo High School.

Eastern El Segundo is part of the tax base for the Wiseburn Unified School District, and formerly for the Centinela Valley Union High School District (CVUHSD). There are no residential areas in the eastern part of the city. This portion of the city includes corporate operations providing significant tax revenue to the districts.

Vistamar School is a private school in El Segundo.

Originally all of the city was located in the Wiseburn School District, which opened in 1896. When the Inglewood Union High School District, now known as the CVUHSD, opened in 1905, its territory included the Wiseburn district. In 1912 the El Segundo School District opened, taking territory from the Wiseburn School District. The territory of the El Segundo district continued to be in the Inglewood Union District. On November 22, 1925, the El Segundo High School District was formed and El Segundo withdrew from the Inglewood Union district.

Media
The El Segundo Herald is the community newspaper for El Segundo. It was established in 1911, six years before the city was incorporated. It had its centennial anniversary of service to the community in 2011.

A monthly arts and culture publication, The El Segundo Scene, began printing in May 2018. Created and run by two El Segundo residents, the magazine serves El Segundo and its neighbors in the South Bay.

Infrastructure

Transportation
State Route 1 passes through the city as Pacific Coast Highway, while Interstate 105 begins its journey at Sepulveda Boulevard (the continuation of State Route 1 north of El Segundo city limits) just outside the northern city limits of El Segundo and heads east to Norwalk.

Amtrak's El Segundo Bus Stop (ESG) is located at the Los Angeles County Metro Green Line Douglas Station and is serviced by Thruway Motorcoach. The stop is on Amtrak's 1c bus route that runs four times a day between Amtrak's Torrance Bus Stop (Alpine Village) and the Bakersfield Amtrak Station where passengers transfer to and from trains on Amtrak's San Joaquin route; passengers can also connect with Amtrak's Pacific Surfliner route at the Van Nuys Amtrak Station.

Los Angeles International Airport (LAX) is located immediately to the north of El Segundo. In 2014, an air quality study found harmful ultrafine particles from the takeoffs and landings at LAX to be of a much greater magnitude than previously thought.

Notable people
 Roseanne Barr, comedian, owns Full Moon and High Tides Productions
 George Brett, baseball player, Hall of Fame
 Ken Brett, baseball player
 Joe Caravello, NFL football player
 Dick Dale, guitarist, pioneer of Surf music
 Rusty Frank, author, choreographer, producer, dance historian
 Mike Gordon, Assemblymember and mayor of El Segundo
 Carl Koppelman, accountant and forensic sketch artist
 Dave LaRoche, baseball pitcher
 Vladimir Matyushenko, UFC fighter
 Christopher McCandless, adventurer who inspired the book Into the Wild and the 2007 film The Call of the Wild
 Dave McCoy, skier and businessman, founder of Mammoth Mountain, was born in El Segundo
 Scott McGregor, baseball player
 Lars Nootbaar, MLB baseball player for the St. Louis Cardinals
 Bob Samuelson, volleyball player
 John Van Hamersveld, artist and surfer
 Paul Westphal, basketball player and coach
 Dave Williamson, stand-up comedian

In popular culture
 A Tribe Called Quest's single "I Left My Wallet In El Segundo" revolves around a stop through the town on the way back to Brooklyn.
 El Segundo is frequently referenced by Fred G. Sanford in the TV series Sanford and Son.
 Although filmed in British Columbia, the music video for the song "First Date", by pop-punk band Blink-182, takes place in El Segundo in 1974.
 The fictitious Silicon Valley company Pied Piper tapped the real-life, El Segundo-headquartered company Wpromote to develop its ill-fated mascot, Pipey.

See also
 Automobile Driving Museum - a museum in El Segundo.

References

External links

 
 El Segundo Chamber of Commerce

 
1917 establishments in California
Cities in Los Angeles County, California
Incorporated cities and towns in California
Populated coastal places in California
Populated places established in 1917
South Bay, Los Angeles